Vadym Yevhenovych Ivchenko (born 29 January 1980) is a Ukrainian politician who has served as a People's Deputy of Ukraine in the 8th and 9th convocations of the Verkhovna Rada. Ivchenko is a strong advocate of pro-Western reforms in Ukraine, and has taken an active role in their implementation as an Ambassador of the United Nations Foundation “European Silk Road Project” promoting the SDG agenda, a member of the MDO elevating anti-corruption culture in Ukraine and a member of the Verkhovna Rada’s Committee on National Security, Defence and Intelligence.After a full-scale Russia’s invasion in February 2022 Mr.Ivchenko started active volunteer activity. 
Mr.Ivchenko has held several successful campaigns to raise funds for the purchase and delivery small weapons for Armed Forces of Ukraine.
Mr.Ivchenko has set up and maintain connections with manufacturers defense product in the EU and the USA. Mr.Ivchenko is very active in negotiations with Textron Systems and other Corporations in cases of Armored Vehicles, helicopters, aircraft.
In 2022 Mr.Ivchenko became the member of the Ukrainian delegation to the Parliamentary Asswmbly of the Black Sea Economic Cooperation (PABSEC).

Career & Education
In 2022 Ivchenko bacame a member of the Committee on National Security, Defence and Intelligence.
In 2021 Ivchenko became an official Ambassador of the United Nations Foundation 'European Silk Road' project, promoting the SDG agenda in cooperation between the United Nations Foundation and the European Council. Ivchenko is also a member of the Strategic Council of the Association of Bioethanol Producers and a member of the MDO’s “Deputy Control” responsible for promoting the foundations of anti-corruption culture in Ukraine.
 In 2014 Ivchenko was elected as a People's Deputy of Ukraine in the 2014 Ukrainian parliamentary election. He became the assistant to the Chairman of the Verkhovna Rada's Committee on Agricultural Policy and Sustainable Farming. As well as a representative of the All-Ukrainian Association of Village and Settlement Councils in the Verkhovna Rada and the Trade Unions of the Ukrainian Agricultural Sector.
 From 2012 to 2014, Ivchenko was a Managing Executive of the All-Ukrainian Association of Village and Settlement councils.
 From 2005 to 2012, Ivchenko was the Director and President of Intergroup LLC

Ivchenko was re-elected to parliament in the 2019 Ukrainian parliamentary election. For both elections he was on the Batkivshchyna election list, as number 6 in 2014 and number 24 in 2019.

Education
In 2018 Ivchenko received his PhD in Economic Sciences on Speciality Economics and Management of the National Economy at the NSC’s Institute of Agrarian Economy
In 2017 he studied at the Academy of Democracy and Diplomacy in Washington, DC, USA.
In 2014 studied in National University of Kyiv-Mohyla Academy.
In 2011 he received his Master’s degree in State Management at the National Academy for Public Administration under the President of Ukraine.
From 1997 to 2002, Ivchenko received a Bachelor’s degree in International Affairs from the Kyiv Humanitarian Institute.

Ambassador of Foundation for United Nations  SDG "Silk Road" Project

In March 2021, Vadym Ivchenko was appointed as an Ambassador of the Foundation for United Nations SDG  and Council of Europe ‘European Silk Road’ Project. This honour was awarded by the Foundation for United Nations promoting the SDG agenda, in association with the Center for UNESCO in Bologna  and the Council of Europe representing the project.

The Association of Bioethanol Producers
Ivchenko, as a member of Verkhovna Rada's Committee on agricultural policy and sustainable farming, is involved on the Strategic Council of the Association of Bioethanol Producers. He has been systematically defending the interests of the agro-industrial sector and bioethanol in particular.

International relations
Vadym Ivchenko is a strong advocate pro-Western reforms in Ukraine. He has been outspoken on a number of progressive topics, including environmentally conscious agricultural policy and the need for a transparent stock market system for agricultural produce and sales. Ivchenko is involved in promoting the use of biofuels and biogas, alternative energy resources, active international cooperation, combating global hunger, the fight against unemployment and the climate change crisis. The following links are to his recent articles in Eureporter:

 Worldwide Food Insecurity
 Agriculture's role today
 Ukraine's Role in the World today
 Global partnerships
 Biofuels, biogas, progressive technology and environment

Foreign Investments

Ivchenko supports international investment in the Ukrainian economy and especially in the agricultural sector. He worked closely with Cargill Ukraine - represented by the former vice president of Cargill, Ivan Miroshnichenko - as they established in Ukraine and subsequently the company provided Ukraine a state loan of €250m. Additionally, he cooperated with Saudi Arabian Fas Energy Group, as well as China’s Power Group, in developing a solar energy plant in Ukraine. Furthermore, Ivchenko is currently working to secure international funds to implement projects in waste management, waste recycling, bioethanol plants, wind farms and solar energy facilities here in Ukraine.
 
Ivchenko has accused Ukraine of being “asleep at the wheel” with regards to its stances on foreign investments, judicial reforms, fiscal reforms and anti-corruption initiatives. He suggests that these improvements, together with well managed international investments, would build trust within the international community and bridge the gap between Ukraine and the West.

Environment and Alternative Energy
Ivchenko considers the production of biofuels from agricultural waste to be a lifeline for the Global Environmental Crisis and the way in which Ukraine can actively and effectively contribute. Ukraine currently produces huge amounts of agricultural waste and he believes that this can be used to drive Ukraine’s fight against the crisis. The problem he highlights, however, is Ukraine’s lack of technical expertise and funding for the agricultural sector due to its inward looking policies. 

Renewable Agenda

In order to implement these reforms, Ivchenko proposes an investment roadmap. His plan would see US companies, with funding and expertise in Biofuel development and production, working with Ukrainian agricultural producers to revolutionise sustainable Ukrainian agriculture. Ivchenko believes that committing just 20% of Ukraine’s corn producing facilities to producing biofuels would help Ukraine on the way to becoming a world-leader in renewable energy production by using the waste that once polluted Ukraine’s soil to benefit the nation and its people. 
 
Ivchenko states that economy and ecology are not mutually exclusive but linked in the fight against the Global Environmental Crisis.

Agricultural Land and International Investments

Ivchenko is highly outspoken on the topic of land sale and potential land based investments as addressed in his article published on the front page of the London Globe- “There for the Taking: How Ukraine’s fertile real estate has quickly become the centre of international attention”. Ivchenko highlights that the area of agricultural land leased to foreign investors is roughly equal to the size of Switzerland- 4 million hectares. The main complexities of this land-leasing are ambiguous property rights, trust-building, an ineffectual judicial system, political and economic instability, foreign countries being seen to pursue their national interests in the face of ever-changing global circumstances, the clash of the American and Russian spheres of influence and the Ukrainian population’s weariness of corruption.

Membership in International Friendship Groups
• Deputy Co-Chair of the Group for Interparliamentary Relations with the People's Republic of China
• Member of the Interparliamentary Relations Group with Georgia
• Member of the Interparliamentary Relations Group with the United Arab Emirates
• Member of the Interparliamentary Relations Group with the United Kingdom of Great Britain and Northern Ireland
• Member of the Interparliamentary Relations Group with the French Republic
• Member of the Interparliamentary Relations Group with the Republic of Azerbaijan

PABSE & Public activity
Ivchenko actively participated in the 46th, 48th, 49th and 50th sessions of the Parliamentary Assembly of the Black Sea Economic Cooperation.

Public activity
In 2015 he was a member of the executive committee of Ukrainian Football Federation.
In 2012 to 2014 he was a member of the working group on agricultural markets at the Ministry of Agricultural Policy
From 2010 to 2014, he served as deputy of the City Council of Bila Tserkva, Kyiv Oblast.
2005 — a member of the Ukraine - NATO  meeting (Vilnius). 
2004 — a member of the Latvian Youth Seminar (Liepaja, Latvia). 
2000 — a member of the Danish youth seminar (Alborg, Denmark).
1999 — a Chairman of the Ukrainian Youth Delegation at the 45th General Atlantic Treaty Association (Strasburg).
From 1998 to 2001 — a Vice-President of the Youth Organization — «Euroclub» at Kyiv Humanity Institute.
From 1999 to 2001 — Chairman of the Youth Forum АРУ. 
In 1997 — a member of Atlantic Council of Ukraine.

Legislative work
Vadym Ivchenko is the author and co-author of a number of important legislative bills for Ukraine, which became laws:
 - to stimulate the establishment and operation of the family farms;
 - to bring the legislation in the field of seeding and sending nurseries, so that they could function in line with European and international requirements;
 - to reduce the administrative burden; and many more.

Business
An active supporter of pro-environmental policies, eco-friendly resources and renewable energy, Ivchenko implements his personal views and beliefs not only in politics but also in business. He’s involved at the executive level in several enterprises that produce green energy, such as BC SOLAR LLC and ECO-ENERGY LDN LLC as well as the founder of the farm AGRO-CITY.

Early life & Private life
Vadym Ivchenko grew up in a military family. His father Ivchenko Evgeny Ivanovych was born in Karaganda, Kazakhstan and was a Soviet Army Colonel. The family moved a lot, as a result of their service duty. Being born in Usuriisk, USSR, where his father was stationed at the time, Vadym spent his formative years living and going to school in Primorskiy Krai, USSR, then in Grozny, Chechnia and finally moving to Uzyn, Ukraine. His father taught him army discipline, strong will, respect, honor, loyalty and devotion to country and duty. His mother Plishakova Liudmyla Mykolaivna born in Sibirtsevo, Primorsky Krai, USSR, was a military economist and accountant, she taught him order and love towards his studies. 
Vadym Ivchenko is a master of the sport of boxing.

Amongst Ivchenko's hobbies are tennis, surfing, yachting and all kinds of sports activities. He also enjoys free fall parachute jumps and travel. Ivchenko reads extensively and enjoys trying and learning new things. He has remained professionally devoted to boxing and supported boxing initiatives throughout his life. He is married with two children.

Sports supporter
 Vadym Ivchenko is a master of boxing and an active sports lover. He was one of the sponsors of the first ever Ukrainian official award ceremony of the Kyiv Regional Boxing Federation.
 Ivchenko supported and sponsored the All-Ukrainian boxing tournament, dedicated to the memory of the renown coaches V.I. Kurilova and S.I. Kosyakova 
 Ivchenko is a Member of the National Parliament football team

References

External links

All-Ukrainian Union "Fatherland" politicians
Eighth convocation members of the Verkhovna Rada
Ninth convocation members of the Verkhovna Rada
1980 births
Living people
National Academy of State Administration alumni
People from Ussuriysk
21st-century Ukrainian politicians